The Asturian Socialist Federation (Spanish: Federación Socialista Asturiana), often shortened to FSA–PSOE, is the regional section of the Spanish Socialist Workers' Party (PSOE) in the Principality of Asturias. It was formed on 27 January 1901 from the Socialist local groupings of Gijón (formed in 1891), Oviedo (1892), Mieres and Langreo (1897) and others.

Since the Spanish transition to democracy started in 1975 and since the establishment of the Spanish "State of Autonomies" in 1983, the FSA–PSOE has governed Asturias nearly uninterruptedly from 1983 to 1995, from 1999 to 2011 and again since 2012.

History

Foundation and early years (1901-1931) 
After the foundation of the PSOE on 2 May 1879, socialist groups were gradually organised in the main towns and cities of Asturias. Thus, in 1891, the Gijón local group was set up, followed by the Oviedo group in 1892 and those of Mieres and Sama de Langreo in 1897. Between 1899 and 1901, socialism took root in Asturias and finally, on 27 January 1901, the founding Congress of the Asturian Socialist Federation of the Spanish Socialist Workers' Party (FSA-PSOE) was held in Oviedo's Centro Obrero (Workers' Centre). Manuel Vigil Montoto was elected president of the first Provincial Committee.

Second Republic and Civil War (1931-1939) 
In 1934, the FSA-PSOE formed part of the workers' alliance formalised in the Uníos Hermanos Proletarios (UHP, Unite Proletarian Brothers) and agreed with the pact signed between the socialist trade union Unión General de Trabajadores (UGT, General Union of Workers) and the Regional Confederation of Labour of Asturias, León and Palencia of the anarcho-syndicalist organisation CNT. The UHP - which was later joined by other workers' organisations - played a significant role in the 1934 Revolution.

During the Spanish Civil War, the Socialist Belarmino Tomás presided over the Interprovincial Council of Asturias and León, later transformed into the Sovereign Council of Asturias and León.

Franco's dictatorship (1939-1975) 
Like all other left-wing and republican parties, the FSA was outlawed and its members persecuted and sometimes killed. While the UGT, the trade union linked to the party, maintained some activity during the dictatorship, especially during the labour conflicts in the region, the main opposition to the francoist regime was the Communist Party of Asturias (PCA) and its allies in the region.

Transition and democracy (since 1975) 
After Franco's regime and with the advent of democracy, the FSA regained its leading role. Rafael Luis Fernández Álvarez presided over the two governments of the Regional Council of Asturias, the pre-autonomous body that would govern Asturias from 1978 to 1982, as well as the first pre-electoral government of the Principality of Asturias. On Sunday, 14 May 1978, Felipe González and Enrique Tierno Galván gave a rally in the El Molinón football stadium in Gijón attended by 25,000 people.

The FSA-PSOE won the Presidency of the Principality in the first regional election in 1983 with Pedro de Silva Cienfuegos-Jovellanos as leader. In 1991 he was succeeded by Juan Luis Rodríguez-Vigil Rubio, who resigned after the Petromocho scandal and was replaced by Antonio Trevín Lombán in 1993. After a legislature in opposition, in 1999 the FSA, led by Vicente Álvarez Areces, once again gained access to the regional government - thanks in part to the instability generated by regional president Sergio Marqués' break with the PP, founding the Unión Renovadora Asturiana (URAS, Asturias Renewal Union) in 1998. The socialists later won the regional elections in 2003 and 2007.

After six months in 2011 of minority government led by Francisco Álvarez-Cascos, president of Foro Asturias (FAC, Asturian Forum), another PP's split, the FSA regained the presidency of Asturias in 2012 with Javier Fernández Fernández. He was re-elected after the May 2015 elections.

In the PSOE crisis of 2016, a new leadership emerged in the FSA-PSOE that led to the 32nd congress and the election of Adrián Barbón as Secretary General on 1 October 2017. Barbón himself was the head of the list for the regional elections on 26 May 2019, winning six more seats than those won by Javier Fernández in 2015. Adrián Barbón was sworn in as President of the Principality of Asturias on 20 July 2019.

Electoral performance

General Junta of the Principality of Asturias

Cortes Generales

European Parliament

See also
Spanish Socialist Workers' Party

References

1901 establishments in Spain
Asturias
Political parties established in 1901
Political parties in Asturias
Social democratic parties in Spain